The flora of Great Britain and Ireland is one of the best documented in the world. There are 1390 native species and over 1100 well-established non-natives documented on the islands. A bibliographic database of the species is compiled by the Botanical Society of Britain and Ireland. Because of the size of the list, it is spread across multiple pages.

 Part 1 covers ferns and allies (Lycopodiopsida, Equisetopsida and Pteridopsida)
 Part 2 covers the conifers (Pinopsida)

The remaining parts cover the flowering plants (Magnoliopsida):

 Part 3, covering a group of dicotyledon families (Lauraceae to Salicaceae)
 Part 4, covering another group of dicotyledon families (Brassicaceae to Saxifragaceae)
 Part 5, covering the dicotyledon family Rosaceae
 Part 6, covering another group of dicotyledon families (Mimosaceae to Dipsacaceae)
 Part 7, covering the dicotyledon family Asteraceae
 Part 8, covering the monocotyledons (Butomaceae to Orchidaceae)

The list gives an English name and a scientific name for each species, and two symbols are used to indicate status (e for extinct species, and * for introduced species).

Ireland
Lists of the plant species found in Ireland can be found at Irish Species Register The lists on this site are based on these "Key references"

Scannell, M.J.P. & Synnott, D.M. (1987). Census catalogue of the flora of Ireland. A list of Pteridophyta, Gymnospermae and Angiospermae including all the native plants and established aliens known to occur in Ireland with the distribution of each species, and recommended Irish and English names. pp. [i]-xxvii, 1-171, map. Dublin: Stationery Office.
Reynolds, S.C.P. (2002). A catalogue of alien plants in Ireland. pp. [4], 1-413. Dublin: National Botanical Gardens, Glasnevin.Access the lists via the Taxonomy Browser

See also
Biodiversity in British Overseas Territories
Vice-county Census Catalogue of the Vascular Plants of Great Britain (book)
Flora of Ireland

References 

-
-
Lists of biota of the British Isles

ru:Флора Ирландии